Narumon Pinyosinwat (born 29 October 1973) is a Thai politician. She served as Deputy Minister of Labour in the second cabinet of Prime Minister Prayut Chan-o-cha. She previously served as government spokesperson.

Early life and education 
Narumon was born on 29 October 1973 in Bangkok. She graduated with a Bachelor of Science in Statistics (Applied Mathematics) from Faculty of Commerce and Accountancy, Chulalongkorn University before continuing to study until completing a master's degree Master of Science (Applied Mathematics) at Georgia State University. Then she graduated with a Master of Business Administration (Applied Economics) and a Doctor of Philosophy (Finance) from the Wharton School of the University of Pennsylvania, USA.

Careers 
She was previously a lecturer and professor at the NIDA business school, National Institute of Development Administration. Before later, she was persuaded by Uttama Savanayana to become Assistant Minister of Finance of Minister Apisak Tantivorawong after resigning to run for the general election.

Political careers 
Naruamon joined the Palang Pracharat Party to run for the party's fifth party list of members of the House of Representatives and get elected later, after resigning to serve as a spokesman for the Prime Minister's Office in the Government of Prayut Chan-o-cha. 

On 9 September 2021, Narumon was sacked from cabinet due to the Royal Gazette published a royal command removing them both from their portfolios and the cabinet after he was earlier accused of being behind a move to oust Prime Minister Prayut during last week's censure debate in parliament.

References 

Living people
1973 births
Place of birth missing (living people)
Narumon Pinyosinwat
Narumon Pinyosinwat
Narumon Pinyosinwat
Narumon Pinyosinwat
Narumon Pinyosinwat
Narumon Pinyosinwat
Narumon Pinyosinwat